Ormocarpopsis is a genus of flowering plants in the family Fabaceae, and was recently assigned to the informal monophyletic Dalbergia clade of the Dalbergieae. It contains the following species:
 Ormocarpopsis aspera R. Viguier
 Ormocarpopsis calcicola R. Viguier
 Ormocarpopsis itremoensis Du Puy & Labat
 Ormocarpopsis mandrarensis Dumaz-le-Grand
 Ormocarpopsis nitida (Du Puy & Labat) Thulin & Lavin
 Ormocarpopsis parvifolia Dumaz-le-Grand

 Ormocarpopsis tulearensis Du Puy & Labat

References

 
Fabaceae genera
Taxonomy articles created by Polbot